Heterochordeumatidae is a family of millipedes belonging to the order Chordeumatida. Adult millipedes in this family have 30 or 32 segments (counting the collum as the first segment and the telson as the last).

Genera:
 Heterochordeuma Pocock, 1893
 Infulathrix Shear, 2000
 Pyrgeuma Shear, 2013
 Sumatreuma Hoffman, 1963

References

Chordeumatida